"Charge & Go! / Lights" (stylized as "Charge ▶ Go! / Lights") is the 30th single by Japanese pop group AAA. It is included in the group's seventh studio album 777: Triple Seven. "Charge & Go!" was written by Kenn Kato and Mitsuhiro Hidaka. The single was released in Japan on November 16, 2011, under Avex Trax in five editions: a CD-only edition, a CD and DVD A edition, a CD and DVD B edition, a box set edition, and a Mu-Mo edition. "Charge & Go! / Lights" debuted at number five on the weekly Oricon singles chart. The single charted for nine weeks and went on to sell over 52,400 copies in Japan.

Composition
"Charge & Go!" was written by Kenn Kato and Mitsuhiro Hidaka, composed by Tetsuya Komuro, and arranged by ArmySlick. "Lights" was written by Yusuke Toriumi and Hidaka, composed by Bounceback, and arranged by Tohru Watanabe.

Release and promotion
"Charge & Go! / Lights" was released on November 16, 2011, in five editions: a CD-only edition, which includes "6th Anniversary Sabi Medley", a medley of AAA's previous singles "Blood on Fire", "Champagne Gold", "Dragon Fire", "Metamorphose", "Jamboree!!", "That's Right", "Sunshine", and "Hurricane Riri, Boston Mari"; a CD and DVD A edition, which includes the music video for "Charge & Go!" and the first part of the music video making; a CD and DVD B edition, which includes the second part of the music video making; a CD and DVD A edition, which includes the music video for "Charge & Go!" and the first part of the music video making; a CD-only Mu-Mo edition; a Mu-Mo box set edition which includes the Think About AAA 6th Anniversary clips from seasons 13 and 14. "Charge & Go!" was used in television advertisements for Morinaga & Company's energy drink  Weider in Jelly. At the end of 2011, a smartphone download version of the single was released.

Chart performance
"Charge & Go! / Lights" debuted at number four on the weekly Oricon singles charts, selling 48,912 copies in its first week. It went on to chart for nine weeks and sold over 52,400 copies in Japan. On the issue dated March 5, 2012, "Charge & Go!" debuted at number 13 on the Billboard Japan Hot 100. On the Recording Industry Association of Japan (RIAJ) Digital Track Chart, "Charge & Go!" and "Lights" debuted at numbers 22 and 69, respectively.

Track listing

Chart history

Notes
  The sales figure of 52,400 copies is taken from accumulating the sales of the single during its first two charting weeks on the Oricon weekly singles chart (48,912, 3,564).

References

2011 singles
2011 songs
AAA (band) songs
Avex Trax singles
Japanese-language songs
Songs written by Mitsuhiro Hidaka